Kitamilo is a town in Buvuma District, in Central Uganda. It is the main municipal, administrative and commercial center of the district. The district headquarters are located there.

Location
Kitamiiro is located on one of the fifty-two (52) islands that constitute the district of Buvuma, in Central Uganda. The exact location of Kitamiiro is not yet known, because it does not yet appear on most publicly available maps.

See also
 Buvuma District
 Central Uganda
 Lake Victoria

References

External links
  Buvuma District Internet Portal

Populated places in Central Region, Uganda
Cities in the Great Rift Valley
Buvuma District
Lake Victoria